Tian Wei (born February 1959) is a Chinese surgeon and professor and doctoral supervisor at Peking University and Tsinghua University. He is an academician of the Chinese Academy of Engineering and serves as the president and deputy party chief of Beijing Jishuitan Hospital.

Biography
Tian was born in February 1959. After graduating from Peking University Health Science Center in 1983, he became a surgeon at Beijing Jishuitan Hospital. In 1989 he pursued advanced studies in Japan, earning a doctor's degree from Hirosaki University in 1994. Then He carried out postdoctoral research at the university. He returned to China in 1995 and that same year became vice-president of Beijing Jishuitan Hospital. He founded spinal surgery for the hospital and served as its director. He has been president of the hospital since 2003.

Honours and awards
 October 21, 2016 Science and Technology Progress Award of the Ho Leung Ho Lee Foundation
 September 1, 2017 Honorary Fellow of the Royal College of Surgeons of Edinburgh
 January 14, 2019 Foreign Fellow of the Académie Nationale de Médecine 
 November 22, 2019 Member of the Chinese Academy of Engineering (CAE)

References

1959 births
Living people
Peking University alumni
Hirosaki University alumni
Academic staff of Peking University
Academic staff of Tsinghua University
Chinese surgeons
Académie Nationale de Médecine
Members of the Chinese Academy of Engineering